Austin Washington (born September 26, 1985) is an American professional soccer player who most recently played for Chicago Fire in Major League Soccer.

Career

College and amateur
Washington attended Joel E Ferris High School

Professional
Washington was drafted in the fourth round (54th overall) of the 2008 MLS SuperDraft by Chicago Fire. He was sent on loan to the Cleveland City Stars for one game in early 2009 before returning to complete the season with the Chicago Fire.

Post-soccer
As a doctoral student, Washington teaches religion at Phillips Exeter Academy.

References

External links
MLS player profile
Gonzaga bio

1985 births
Living people
American soccer players
Major League Soccer players
Chicago Fire FC players
Cleveland City Stars players
Gonzaga Bulldogs men's soccer players
Soccer players from Washington (state)
Spokane Shadow players
Spokane Spiders players
Sportspeople from Spokane, Washington
Colorado Rapids U-23 players
USL First Division players
USL League Two players
Whitworth Pirates men's soccer players
Chicago Fire FC draft picks
Association football defenders